Douglas "Doug" Malewicki is an American aerospace engineer and inventor of Polish descent. Many of his inventions concern flying vehicles, but the range is quite diverse. He is also the concept creator and inventor of Skytran PRT (Personal Rapid Transit).

Green vehicles
Malewicki spent the past 25 years advancing the Skytran concept: ultra-light computer-controlled cars hanging below aluminum  Maglev (magnetic levitation) tracks that could be supported above roads just by utility poles or the sides of buildings.  Skytran basically combines maglev (which allows high speeds) and a hanging design (more stable; smaller tracks) with the 1960s idea of Personal Rapid Transit (PRT) -- cars individual commuters take directly to their destination (hence "Personal"), but computer-driven and available to others after they exit (hence "Transit").  Another key PRT idea Skytran follows is exiting the main track for boarding; so the cars behind don't need to wait as they do with mass transit vehicles.  
 In 2019 Israeli media said that Skytran was being considered as a transportation solution for bringing baggage and passengers from the new Ramon Airport to the city of Eilat, 20 kilometers away. Skytran was advanced in Israel since 2002 and was proposed at the Knesset in 2011. In 2011 it was revealed that a model of Skytran was being developed along with Israel Aerospace Industries.

Malewicki developed the 157 and 156-miles-per-gallon "California Commuter" cars that hold the Guinness fuel economy records for street-legal vehicles driven at freeway speeds—an example of  green vehicles.

He studied and developed various engineering solutions for Highly-aerodynamic Human-powered vehicles such as Recumbent bicycles.

Other vehicles

Malewicki developed the following vehicles and rides: 
Robosaurus, a 40-foot Tyrannosaurus rex-inspired "entertainment robot" that bites cars and airplanes in half at car shows. This thrill ride folds into a truck and can be driven between locations. It is featured in the movie Waking up in Reno where it is intended to be used as a revenge tool, to consume an SUV about to be sold.
The X-1 Skycycle, and Skycycle X-2 rocket-powered motorcycle that daredevil Evel Knievel shot over the Snake River Canyon to test the viability of his Skycycle jump. (Malewicki's colleague Robert Truax created the final design.)
Engineering and design assistance of the rocketbelt, the RB-2000.
The "Droid of Death" wing-morphing Unmanned Aerial Vehicle (UAV) developed and tested under contract from DARPA.
Patented Kitecycle for stuntman/daredevil Bob Correll who reached world record with it.

Other inventions and innovations
Malewicki was also involved in the development and invention of the following:

Malewicki designed the Nuclear War card game, and had been selling it independently beginning in 1965. Rick Loomis of Flying Buffalo, for whom the game was one of the influences on his own Nuclear Destruction PBM, noticing that people were confusing the two games with each other, so after tracking Malewicki down, he added the game to his own catalogue and started publishing Nuclear War through Flying Buffalo in 1972. Expansions included "Nuclear Proliferation", "Nuclear Escalation", and "Weapons of Mass Destruction".

An aeronautical engineer by training, Malewicki spent much of his career working for American aeronautics and space companies: the Apollo program moon landing vehicles, the Stealth bomber, and Cessna aircraft including their first private jet airplane.  He was a model rocket enthusiast, becoming famous early in his career for the Malewicki Equations that predicted the altitude and coast time of a model rocket flight.

According to Malewicki's daughter, he was the inspiration for the original one eyed monster, called Mike on Pee-wee's Playhouse TV show, and later to become the inspiration for Mike Wazowski drawn by Ricky Nierva in Monsters, Inc.. A copy of the game plans in which he drew the first image of this alien is distributed free.

See also
 Skytran and PRT
 Robosaurus
 Malewicki Equations
 Nuclear War (card game)
 Robert Truax and Skycycle X-2
 The RB-2000 rocket belt.
 Bob Correll stuntman

Notes

External links
 Aerodynamics of human powered land vehicles Scientific American issue 240 (1978).
 The Skytran website including bio
 Dougs blog and bio website - dedicated mainly to the Robosaurus
 Collapsible cars - Episode of Junkyard Wars TV series

Year of birth missing (living people)
Place of birth missing (living people)
Living people
American inventors